Wallowa may refer to:

Places 
Wallowa, Oregon
Wallowa County, Oregon
Wallowa Lake
Wallowa Lake State Park
Wallowa Mountains
Wallowa River

Other 
Acacia calamifolia, a shrub or tree
Acacia euthycarpa, a shrub or tree
 The Wallowa, the original name of the tugboat Arthur Foss 
 The Wallowa band of the Nez Perce

See also
 
 Walloway, South Australia